In Greek mythology, Eurymachus (/jʊˈrɪməkəs/; Ancient Greek: Εὐρύμαχος Eurúmakhos) was an Ithacan nobleman and one of the two leading suitors of Penelope, the other being Antinous.

Family 
Eurymachus was the son of Polybus, also a suitor of Penelope.

Mythology 
In Homer’s Odyssey, Eurymachus, along with the majority of his fellow suitors, shows no regard for the Greek custom of xenia or guest-friend hospitality; he is arrogant, disrespectful, and consumes food and drink without the slightest reciprocation. Eurymachus is noteworthy for being manipulative and deceitful, at one point even fooling Penelope into thinking him without ill-intent. Although he arranges for the death of Odysseus’ son, Telemachus, his plan fails and he is later killed by Odysseus. He claims in his childhood Odysseus befriended him often, and tells Penelope that makes Telemachus 'my dearest friend on Earth' and he will protect him, though 'death for Telemachus was in his heart'. After Antinous is shot, Eurymachus appeals to Odysseus, blaming Antinous for all the trouble that had been caused and saying what the suitors took will be repaid. Odysseus, however, maintains that killing will continue until he has satiated his taste for vengeance, whereupon Eurymachus runs at Odysseus with his sword, but Odysseus shoots an arrow into Eurymachus’ chest, stopping him dead.

Penelope's maid, Melantho, is his lover.

Notes

Reference 

 Homer, The Odyssey with an English Translation by A.T. Murray, PH.D. in two volumes. Cambridge, MA., Harvard University Press; London, William Heinemann, Ltd. 1919. . Online version at the Perseus Digital Library. Greek text available from the same website.

Achaeans (Homer)
Characters in the Odyssey